Juego de Héroes (in English, Heroes Game) is a 2016 Mexican produced by Juan Manuel Robles and Pedro Cedillo drama film directed by Pedro Álvarez Tostado. The story primarily revolves around two characters, Luis and Carlitos, who are very different but share a common obsession, soccer. As fate would have it, these great friends take different life paths. Luis (played by Sebastián Zurita) becomes a soccer superstar for the C.F. Pachuca team, but after a serious injury during the International Club Tournament, he is unable to return to the field indefinitely. On the other hand, Carlitos, the son of a single mother who by the hands of fate joins the same orphanage where she grew up develops his gift for healing. After 10 years, these great friends meet again at a crucial moment, their lives changed forever.

Cast
 Sebastián Zurita as Luis
 Francisco Villalvazo as Carlitos
 Omar Ayala as El Diablo
 Cristina Rodlo as Maro 
 Yadira Pascault Orozco as Graciela
 Rafael Simón as The Trainer

References

External links
 

Mexican drama films
2010s Mexican films